L'Ascension is a municipality in the Laurentides region of Quebec, Canada, part of the Antoine-Labelle Regional County Municipality. The area is known as La Vallée de la Rouge (English: The Valley of the Rouge (river)).

History
In 1891, the first missionary made a pastoral visit to the few families that had settled there, and named the place L'Ascension since his visit coincided with the day of the Feast of the Ascension of Jesus Christ.

On September 23, 1905, the Parish Municipality of L'Ascension was formed out of previously unorganized area.

On December 14, 1996, the parish municipality changed statutes and became a (regular) municipality.

Demographics

Private dwellings occupied by usual residents: 488 (total dwellings: 880)

Mother tongue:
 English as first language: 2.2%
 French as first language: 96.1%
 English and French as first language: 0.6%
 Other as first language: 1.1%

Local government

L'Ascension forms part of the federal electoral district of Laurentides—Labelle and has been represented by Marie-Hélène Gaudreau of the Bloc Québécois since 2019. Provincially, L'Ascension is part of the Labelle electoral district and is represented by Chantale Jeannotte of the Coalition Avenir Québec since 2018.

List of former mayors:
 Yves Meilleur (...–2017)
 Luc St-Denis (2017–2021)
 Jacques Allard (2021–present)

Education

Sainte Agathe Academy (of the Sir Wilfrid Laurier School Board) in Sainte-Agathe-des-Monts serves English-speaking students in this community for both elementary and secondary levels.

See also
List of municipalities in Quebec

References

External links

Incorporated places in Laurentides
Municipalities in Quebec